Acacia pedleyi, also known as Pedley's wattle, is a species of Acacia native to eastern Australia. It is considered to be a vulnerable species according to the Nature Conservation Act 1992.

Description
The leaves are dark green and feathery  in length.

Distribution
A. pedleyi occurs in the understorey of open woodland and woodland communities along with Acacia crassa, Corymbia citriodora, Eucalyptus moluccana and Eucalyptus populnea. It is often situated on alluvial flats, hillslopes and ridges. The bulk of the population is located from around the Calliope Range to the Callide Range in the Port Curtis District in the Rockhampton Region of Central Queensland. Other much smaller populations are found near Biloela and around the Degalgil State Forest.

See also
List of Acacia species

References

pedleyi
Fabales of Australia
Flora of Queensland
Taxa named by Mary Tindale
Plants described in 1992